Artifakts [bc] is the fifth studio album by Canadian electronic music producer Richie Hawtin, and his fourth studio album under the alias Plastikman. It was released on November 2, 1998 by Minus and Novamute Records. The album was devised as a way to bridge the periods between the Plastikman albums Musik and Consumed. The tracks on Artifakts [bc] were originally produced by Hawtin for an unreleased album entitled Klinik that was intended to form a trilogy with his prior albums Sheet One and Musik. Hawtin ultimately scrapped Klinik and instead began work on Consumed. "bc" in the title is an acronym for "Before Consumed".

Artifakts [bc] peaked at number 31 on the UK Independent Albums Chart.

Track listing

Personnel
Credits adapted from liner notes.
 Richie Hawtin – music, design, layout
 Seth – design, layout
 Slim – design, layout

Charts

References

External links
 

1998 albums
Richie Hawtin albums
Novamute Records albums